NCAA March Madness 2001 is the 2000 installment in the NCAA March Madness series. Former Cincinnati player Kenyon Martin is featured on the cover.

Reception

The game received "average" reviews according to the review aggregation website Metacritic.

See also
NBA Live 2001

References

External links
 

2000 video games
Basketball video games
EA Sports games
NCAA video games
North America-exclusive video games
PlayStation (console) games
PlayStation (console)-only games
Video games developed in the United States
Black Ops Entertainment games
Multiplayer and single-player video games